Amarynceus (Ancient Greek: Ἀμαρυγκεύς) was in Greek mythology, a chief of the Eleans.

Family 
Amarynceus was the son of Onesimachus or of Acetor (Alector) and Diogeneia. In some account, his father was the Thessalian immigrant Pyttius.

Mnesimache, daughter of Dexamenus of Olenus, was the mother of his son Diores while the other son Hippostratus was said have seduced Periboea, daughter of Hipponous.

Mythology 
According to Hyginus, Amarynceus himself joined the expedition against Troy with nineteen ships. Homer, on the other hand, only mentions Amarynceus' son Diores (also known by the patronymic Amarynceides) as partaking in the Trojan War. 

When Amarynceus died, his sons celebrated funeral games in his honor, in which Nestor took part. According to Pausanias, Amarynceus had been of great service to Augeas against Heracles, in return for which Augeas shared his throne with him.

Notes

References 

 Apollodorus, The Library with an English Translation by Sir James George Frazer, F.B.A., F.R.S. in 2 Volumes, Cambridge, MA, Harvard University Press; London, William Heinemann Ltd. 1921. . Online version at the Perseus Digital Library. Greek text available from the same website.
Gaius Julius Hyginus, Fabulae from The Myths of Hyginus translated and edited by Mary Grant. University of Kansas Publications in Humanistic Studies. Online version at the Topos Text Project.
 Homer, The Iliad with an English Translation by A.T. Murray, Ph.D. in two volumes. Cambridge, MA., Harvard University Press; London, William Heinemann, Ltd. 1924. Online version at the Perseus Digital Library.
 Homer, Homeri Opera in five volumes. Oxford, Oxford University Press. 1920. Greek text available at the Perseus Digital Library.
 Pausanias, Description of Greece with an English Translation by W.H.S. Jones, Litt.D., and H.A. Ormerod, M.A., in 4 Volumes. Cambridge, MA, Harvard University Press; London, William Heinemann Ltd. 1918. . Online version at the Perseus Digital Library
Pausanias, Graeciae Descriptio. 3 vols. Leipzig, Teubner. 1903.  Greek text available at the Perseus Digital Library.
Tzetzes, John, Allegories of the Iliad translated by Goldwyn, Adam J. and Kokkini, Dimitra. Dumbarton Oaks Medieval Library, Harvard University Press, 2015. 

Achaean Leaders
Kings of Elis
Kings in Greek mythology
Elean characters in Greek mythology